A high-arched palate (also termed high-vaulted palate) is where the palate is unusually high and narrow. It is usually a congenital developmental feature that results from the failure of the palatal shelves to fuse correctly in development, the same phenomenon that leads to cleft palate. It may occur in isolation or in association with a number of conditions. It may also be an acquired condition caused by chronic thumb-sucking. A high-arched palate may result in a narrowed airway and sleep disordered breathing.

Examples of conditions which may be associated with a high-arched palate include:

 Allergic rhinitis
 Apert syndrome
 Crouzon syndrome
 Down syndrome
 Ehlers-Danlos Syndrome
 Fragile X syndrome
 Incontinentia pigmenti
 Marfan syndrome
 Treacher Collins syndrome
 Upper Airway Resistance Syndrome

See also
 Minor physical anomalies
 Bardet–Biedl syndrome

References

Palate
Medical signs
Pathology of the maxilla and mandible